Christopher Dorling is the co-founder of Dorling Kindersley, a publishing company, along with Peter Kindersley. He was educated at Leighton Park School. He retired from the company in 1987, but remains a board member.

References 

Living people
Year of birth missing (living people)
People educated at Leighton Park School
British publishers (people)
British company founders
Place of birth missing (living people)